Baten Kaitos may refer to:

 Baten Kaitos (star), the official name of Zeta Ceti's primary component, and the traditional name of the entire Zeta Ceti system
 Baten Kaitos: Eternal Wings and the Lost Ocean, a 2003 role-playing video game
 Baten Kaitos Origins, a 2006 prequel